Ken Hinchey (September 9, 1912 – April 21, 1994) was an American entrepreneur and politician who served one term as Mayor of Anchorage, Alaska from 1955 to 1956.

Early life
Ken Hinchey was born September 9, 1912, in Fern Hill, Tacoma, Washington.

Career 

Hinchey started a number of businesses in Alaska, including Northern Transfer, the Black and White Restaurant, Alaska Aggregate Corporation, Idealaska Cement, and Pacific Western Lines. He also mined gold in Hope, invented machines, and transported oil from Valdez to Fairbanks for the military during World War II. He was an avid bush pilot.

Hinchey was elected to a single term mayor of Anchorage in 1955. He advocated statehood for the Territory of Alaska and building a dam on the Cook Inlet causeway.

Personal life 
In 1933, he married Nadine Graves, and the couple moved to Anchorage, Alaska in 1937. He died April 21, 1994, at the age of 81.

References 
 
 "Alaskan Mayor" (abstract) in The New Yorker, 1956

Bibliography 
 Hinchey, Ken Alaskan "Imagineer", 1994

1912 births
1994 deaths
Alaska Republicans
American construction businesspeople
Aviators from Alaska
Bush pilots
Mayors of Anchorage, Alaska
Politicians from Tacoma, Washington
20th-century American businesspeople
20th-century American politicians